The 2019 Scarborough Borough Council election took place on 2 May 2019 to elect members of the Scarborough Borough Council in England. It was held on the same day as other local elections.

Results summary

Ward results

Burniston & Cloughton

Castle

Cayton

Danby & Mulgrave

Derwent Valley & Moor

Eastfield

Esk Valley

Falsgrave & Stepney

Filey

Fylingdales & Ravenscar

Hunmanby

Mayfield

Newby

Northstead

Scalby

Seamer

Streonshalh

Weaponness & Ramshill

Whitby West Cliff

Woodlands

References

2019 English local elections
May 2019 events in the United Kingdom
2019
2010s in North Yorkshire